Raised Under Grey Skies is the debut album from English singer and songwriter JP Cooper. It was released on 6 October 2017 by Island Records.

Track listing 

Notes
 [a] signifies a co-producer
 [b] signifies an additional producer

Charts

Album

Singles

Certifications

References

2017 debut albums
Island Records albums